The 1991 Women's African Volleyball Championship was the Fifth Edition African continental volleyball Championship for women in Africa and it was held in Cairo, Egypt, with Eight teams participated.

Teams

Final ranking

References

1991 Women
African championship, Women
Women's African Volleyball Championship
International volleyball competitions hosted by Egypt